The Garfield Park riot of 1919 was a race riot that began in Garfield Park in Indianapolis, Indiana on July 14, 1919. Multiple people, including a seven-year-old girl, were wounded when gunfire broke out.

Riot in the park
Amidst racial tensions during the summer of 1919, a group of white youths in Indianapolis thought that they were being followed by groups of African-Americans. On July 14, 1919, hundreds of white boys 16 to 19 years old converged on Garfield Park. There they used bricks and clubs to beat any black people they came across. When a group of African-Americans took shelter in the house of Nathan Weather, a local black man, the white mob followed them and surrounded the house. Weather fired into the crowd in hopes of dispersing the mob. A seven-year-old onlooker, Charlotte Pieper, received a flesh wound from stray buckshot. Another youth, Paul Karbwitz, 18, was also hit. Police were eventually able to disperse the mob and quell the riot.

Aftermath

This uprising was one of several incidents of civil unrest that began in the so-called American Red Summer of 1919. The Summer consisted of terrorist attacks on black communities, and white oppression in over three dozen cities and counties. In most cases, white mobs attacked African American neighborhoods. In some cases, black community groups resisted the attacks, especially in Chicago and Washington, D.C. Most deaths occurred in rural areas during events such as the Elaine Race Riot in Arkansas, where an estimated 100 to 240 black people and 5 white people were killed. Also occurring in 1919 were the Chicago Race Riot and the Washington D.C. race riot which killed 38 and 39 people, respectively, and with both having many more non-fatal injuries and extensive property damage reaching up into the millions of dollars.

See also
Washington race riot of 1919
Mass racial violence in the United States
List of incidents of civil unrest in the United States

Bibliography 
Notes

References  

1919 in Indiana
1919 in military history
1919 riots in the United States
July 1919 events
African-American history between emancipation and the civil rights movement
Racially motivated violence against African Americans
Red Summer
Riots and civil disorder in Indiana
White American riots in the United States
History of racism in Indiana
Crime in Indianapolis